Queens' School, near Watford, Hertfordshire, is a partially selective secondary school and sixth form with academy status. It currently is a specialist science and sports college.

History
The story of Queens' begins with two schools in Watford in the early 20th century.

Watford Central School was founded in 1912 in buildings in Derby Road vacated by Watford Grammar School for Boys when it moved to its present site in West Watford.
In 1950, the central school became a new grammar school on the northwest side of Aldenham Road, Bushey, called Bushey Grammar School.
The buildings vacated in Derby road were then occupied by the Central Primary School.

Alexandra School was founded in 1901 in Judge Street, North Watford.
(These buildings later became an annexe to the Watford School of Art.)
In January 1966 the school moved to the southeast side of Aldenham road, opposite Bushey Grammar School.
The pedestrian underpass under Aldenham Road was built at this time, but the two schools had little interaction.
Alexandra School had only three headmasters in its 68-year history.

In September 1969, the two schools were amalgamated to form Queens' School, a comprehensive school spanning a  site on both sides of Aldenham Road.
At the time of the merger, Bushey Grammar had 800 pupils, while Alexandra School had 500 students.
A crucial early decision was to extend the pastoral system of Bushey Grammar to the new school, with four houses spanning all year groups, two based on each side of Aldenham Road.
This structure has served the school well, and persists to this day.

Grange Park School closed in September 1988, and its pupils transferred to Queens'. The former Grange Park campus became home to Bushey Hall School (now The Grange Academy).

Queens' was awarded grant-maintained status in April 1993 and became a foundation school in September 1999. In September 2003, the school was designated a Specialist Sports College, and in April 2008 also became a Science College.

In July 2011, Queens' converted to academy status. There are 4 houses.

Location
The school occupies a relatively isolated suburban campus on both sides of Aldenham Road, in Bushey on the outskirts of Watford in south Hertfordshire. As an amalgamation of two schools, Queens' has two sites named North and South, linked by an underpass. The north side (the former Bushey Grammar site) borders the Bushey Grove Leisure Centre and the Purcell School of Music (formerly the Royal Caledonian School), whereas the south side (the former Alexandra School site) borders the Metropolitan Police sports grounds as well as a powerleague site accessed through the school car park.

Admissions
Queens' is a partially selective school, selecting 35% of its intake on academic ability, 5% on aptitude for music and 5% on aptitude for sport.
The remaining places are allocated to siblings of current pupils and to applicants living nearest to the school.
However 95% of children admitted live within  of the school.

The school is the largest in Hertfordshire.

Houses
The school is split into four houses, Turing and Franklin (formerly Newton and Drake) based on the north side and Attenborough and Seacole (formerly Auden and Sutherland) based on the south. Students are allocated a house on entry. Each house is typically further subdivided into two or three forms for each year group. Each house has associated colours, which are displayed on ties and school crests as part of the school uniform.

There is a strong identity among students with their house.  This was created through inter-house competitions on sports day, a yearly music competition and various other sports related competition throughout the academic year.  Formerly, each house had both a Head of House and Deputy Head of House, as well as an assistant head of house, who assisted with students pastoral care and helped get to the root of discipline problems rather than simply giving a student a detention. As of 2020, these responsibilities are now handled by Heads of Year. Also there is a friendly rivalry between houses, which adds to the atmosphere of the school.

The House system was praised by the last Ofsted report in September 2006.
The house system is a large part of the reason why this large school does very well, because it makes the school feel like 4 small schools rather than one large one.

Academic performance
GCSE exam results are regularly far above the national average, with outstanding value added figures and the last OFSTED report was very positive about the school.

At A-level the results are also well above average.

Scholastic and sporting achievements

 National Debating champions in 2005 and 2007
 English National Golf Champions 2007
 English Schools FA (ESFA) U19 Football Champions 2008
 English Schools FA (ESFA) U13 Football Runners up 2008
 English Schools FA (ESFA) U14 Football Runners up 2009
 Reached 3 English Schools FA (ESFA) Finals 2011

The school won the 2009 Sports Colleges Award for Innovation for development of a virtual learning environment (VLE).

Discipline                                                                                                                                                                                                                                                                  Queens school's disciplinary system works on stages. If a student is disruptive in class or any other minor offences, they will be given a reminder. If they continue, they will be given a warning. A message will be sent to the parents. If they still continue, they will be given an afterschool detention. Depending on the offence, it will be 30 mins or 1hr.

Notable former pupils
 Mark Oaten, politician, Lib Dem MP from 1997 to 2010 for Winchester
 Kenny Jackett, soccer manager
 Sean Murray, footballer for Dundalk
 Brandon "GH" Ewing, Global Glarketing manager at Nvidia
 Gavin Massey, footballer for Wigan Athletic
 Will Norris, goalkeeper for Burnley
 Alan Bailey, SVP & Treasurer for Paramount Pictures

Bushey Grammar School
 Ann Coffey, Labour MP since 1992 for Stockport
 Terry Johnson, playwright, theatre producer/director
 E. J. Lowe, Professor of Philosophy, Durham University

References

Schools in Hertsmere
Academies in Hertfordshire
Educational institutions established in 1969
1969 establishments in England
Secondary schools in Hertfordshire
Specialist sports colleges in England
Specialist science colleges in England